Socialist Action is a Trotskyist political party in the United States. It publishes the monthly Socialist Action newspaper, has a youth affiliate called Youth for Socialist Action (YSA) and is associated with the Fourth International. In October 2019, a minority faction was expelled or resigned membership from Socialist Action and re-established itself as Socialist Resurgence.

Origins 
Socialist Action was founded in 1983 by a group of veteran socialist activists who state that they were expelled from the Socialist Workers Party for defending the ideas of Permanent Revolution, class independence, and continued support for the Fourth International. Socialist Action was the second group, after the Fourth Internationalist Tendency, expelled during the 1983 purge. The first issue of its newspaper contained no listing of an editorial board.

The group split in 1985, with those leaving forming Socialist Unity.  In 1986 the split merged with Workers Power and the International Socialists to form Solidarity.  Those remaining in Socialist Action went on to act as a new Trotskyist party. Socialist Action was soon involved in planning a Central America solidarity conference.

Electoral campaigns 
Socialist Action has run candidates for elected office on a number of occasions. It views electoral campaigns as a way to promote socialist politics and ultimately dissolve the existing regime in the US, as well as to advocate on behalf of issues that the organization is promoting. As a result of legal challenges, Socialist Action believes it does not have to disclose who the financial supporters of its election campaigns are because of demonstrable government harassment of past socialist candidates. This belief has been challenged in court.

SA member Adam Ritscher was elected to the Douglas County Board of Supervisors in Northern Wisconsin in April 2006. Other examples of Socialist Action election campaigns are Jeff Mackler's 2006 write-in campaign for U.S. Senate in Northern California and Sylvia Weinstein's 1988 campaign for San Francisco Board of Education, in which she won 21,000 votes. In 2010, Socialist Action ran Christopher Hutchinson for the Connecticut's 1st congressional district. Hutchinson gained 955 votes or 0.42%.

Socialist Action nominated their first presidential ticket for the 2016 United States presidential election, selecting national secretary Jeff Mackler for president and Karen Schraufnagel for vice-president. However the SA ticket got no ballot access or write-in status in any state, and thus received zero votes. The party nominated Mackler again in 2020, but again gained no ballot access or write-in status in any state.

In 2018, party member and Iraq War veteran Fred M. Linck was Socialist Action's candidate for United States Senate in Connecticut. The party submitted over 11,000 signatures to the Connecticut Secretary of State, but too many were disqualified for Linck to be placed on the November ballot. Linck asserted that local officials incorrectly invalidated signatures. Despite being left off the ballot, Linck continued to run for office as an official write-in candidate, and ultimately received 70 votes, or 0.01% of the vote.

Political work 
During the Gulf War, Socialist Action was active in the San Francisco Bay Area antiwar movement through the National Campaign Against the War in the Middle East, competing with the Workers World Party-led Coalition Against a Vietnam War in the Middle East.  Critics charged Socialist Action with dominating the Campaign and packing leadership meetings in San Francisco and New York.

Socialist Action has gone through a variety of splits and fusions over the course of its history. Currently it is actively involved in a wide range of movements in the United States which can be turned to their purposes. SA members are in leadership positions in a range of front groups that make up these movements which number hundreds of members, such as the National Assembly to End the U.S. Wars & Occupations, the United National Antiwar Conference, the Climate Crisis Coalition, the Mobilization to Free Mumia Abu-Jamal, Lynne Stewart Defense Committee, Grassroots Immigrant Justice Network.  They have had limited success in working within a number of local trade unions 

Socialist Action has its national office in San Francisco. It also publishes various books and pamphlets through its publishing arm, Socialist Action Books.

References

External links 
 Socialist Action
 Socialist Action newspaper

Far-left politics in the United States
Fourth International (post-reunification)
Political parties established in 1983
Trotskyist parties in the United States